John Nathaniel Norton (May 12, 1878 – October 5, 1960) was an American Democratic Party politician.

Biography
Born on a farm near Stromsburg, Nebraska, on May 12, 1878, Norton attended Bryant Normal University in Stromsburg. He graduated from Nebraska Wesleyan University in 1901 and the University of Nebraska-Lincoln in 1903. He served as clerk and recorder of Polk County, Nebraska, from 1906 to 1909, and served as mayor of Osceola, Nebraska, from 1908 to 1909. Norton moved to a farm near Polk, Nebraska, and farmed from 1910 to 1922.

He was a member of the Nebraska House of Representatives from 1911 to 1918. During this time he introduced a bill to establish a unicameral legislature; the effort failed at the time, but Norton continued to advocate for the idea for two decades until it was finally enacted. Norton was a member of the State Constitutional Convention in 1919 and 1920, and became a Chautauqua and Lyceum lecturer in 1922. He was the Democratic nominee for Governor of Nebraska in 1924, as the Democratic incumbent, Charles W. Bryan, was running for Vice President of the United States. Both Norton and Bryan lost, and Norton returned to lecturing, continuing in that line of work until 1927.

In 1926, Norton was elected as a Democrat to the Seventieth Congress (March 4, 1927 – March 3, 1929), unsuccessfully running for reelection in 1928. In 1930, he was elected to the Seventy-second Congress (March 4, 1931 – March 3, 1933). He was defeated for renomination in 1932 by fellow incumbent Ashton C. Shallenberger, when the two were thrown together in redistricting following Nebraska's loss of one U.S. House seat in reapportionment.

From June 1933 to December 1936, Norton was a representative and adviser to the Agricultural Adjustment Administration. During this time, Norton saw one of his chief political goals accomplished: in 1934 voters in Nebraska approved a constitutional amendment to take effect with the 1936 elections, abolishing the state House of Representatives and granting its powers to the state Senate, forming a unicameral legislature. (This was enacted with the help of U.S. Senator George W. Norris.) Norton was elected to the first "Unicameral" in 1936 and wrote the rules for the new governing body; he served one term in it, in 1937 and 1938.

Norton became a special adviser in the Federal Crop Insurance Corporation in Washington, D.C., where he served from 1939 to 1948.

He died in Washington, D.C., on October 5, 1960, and was buried in Swede Plain Cemetery in Polk County, Nebraska.

Norton's daughter, Evelyn Lincoln, was President John F. Kennedy's personal secretary, serving him both in the Senate and in the White House, for nearly 11 years. She was riding in the motorcade in Dallas on November 22, 1963, when Kennedy was assassinated.

References
 
 
 
 
 Fact Monster

Democratic Party members of the Nebraska House of Representatives
Democratic Party Nebraska state senators
Nebraska Wesleyan University alumni
University of Nebraska–Lincoln alumni
1878 births
1960 deaths
People from Stromsburg, Nebraska
Swedish-American culture in Nebraska
Democratic Party members of the United States House of Representatives from Nebraska
Mayors of places in Nebraska
People from Osceola, Nebraska